Neil Smith (1 April 1949 – 4 March 2003) was an English first-class cricketer, who played eight First-Class matches for Yorkshire County Cricket Club in 1970 and 1971, before moving to Essex where he enjoyed a successful county career until 1981. He also played for Cheshire in the Minor Counties, appearing in occasional List A one day games for them in 1988 and 1989.

Early life and career 
Born at Ossett, Yorkshire, England, Smith had hopes of replacing the long-serving Jimmy Binks behind the stumps for Yorkshire, but found his place taken by the then 18-year-old, David Bairstow. Smith moved to Essex instead to replace Brian Taylor, and established himself in the side in 1973. He had a good pair of hands and, although not at first sight the most nimble of movers, was a key part of the first Essex side to win a trophy. He lost his place in 1981 to David East, captained the Essex Second XI for a season, and then returned to Yorkshire for a business career.

In 187 first-class matches, he took 395 catches and 51 stumpings, and scored 3,336 runs as a pugnacious right-handed batsman. In 171 one-day games, he took 124 catches and 23 stumpings, and scored 851 runs at 10.50, occasionally used as a pinch hitter up the batting order.

Smith died of cancer at age 53 in March 2003, at Dewsbury, Yorkshire.

References

External links
Cricinfo Profile
Cricket Archive Statistics

1949 births
2003 deaths
Yorkshire cricketers
People from Ossett
Essex cricketers
Minor Counties cricketers
Cheshire cricketers
English cricketers
Deaths from cancer in England
Cricketers from Yorkshire
D. H. Robins' XI cricketers
Wicket-keepers